The 1983 Indiana State Sycamores football team represented Indiana State University as a member of the Missouri Valley Conference (MVC) during the 1983 NCAA Division I-AA football season. The Sycamores were led by fourth-year head coach Dennis Raetz and played their home games at  Memorial Stadium. Indiana State finished the season 8–3 overall and 3–2 in MVC play to tie for third place. They were invited to the NCAA I-AA playoffs, where they defeated Eastern Illinois (16–13 in double overtime) in the first round before losing (23–7) in the quarterfinals to eventual national champion Southern Illinois.

The roster included such standout performers as cornerback Wayne Davis and free safety Vencie Glenn, who went on to long successful NFL careers.  Mike Simmonds,  Jeff Miller was selected Honorable Mention All-American, future college head coach Trent Miles was a wide receiver.

Schedule

References

Indiana State
Indiana State Sycamores football seasons
Indiana State Sycamores football